William Hofmann (1924–1995) was an artist who illustrated books in the late 1950s and the 1960s.

Books
The works he illustrated include: 

The First Easter (1959) by Peter Marshall
Five World Biographies (1961) edited by Leon Edel, Elizabeth S. White, Madolyn W. Brown
Four English Biographies Harcourt Brace & World, Inc, (1961) by J. B. Priestley, and O. B. Davis
The Blue of Capricorn (1962) by Eugene Burdick
Indian Uprising, Houghton Mifflin (1962) by George Cory Franklin
The Last Portage: The Biography of a Man Caught Between Two Worlds of the Frontier—Born a White, Raised an Indian]] (1962) by Walter O'Meara
Hero of Trafalgar: the Story of Lord Nelson (1963) by A.B.C. Whipple
Backtrack (1965) by Milton Lott
Time Was, Folkways Press (1965) by John Foster West
Phaëthon (1966) by Merrill Pollack
Heroes, Gods and Monsters of the Greek Myths (1966) by Bernard Evslin
Poems to Remember, Macmillan Company (1967) by Dorothy Petitt. Trade Paperback.

Dust jackets
He also illustrated the dust jackets of:

Kings Will Be Tyrants (1959) by Ward Hawkins
The Last Portage: The Biography of a Man Caught Between Two Worlds of the Frontier—Born a White, Raised an Indian (1962) by Walter O'Meara
The Levantines, Houghton Mifflin (1963) by Fausta Cialente, Isabel Quigly (trans.)
Backtrack (1965), by Milton Lott
The Mountbattens - The Last Royal Success Story, Random House (1965) by Alden Hatch
Avalon, Hodder and Stoughton (1966) by Anya Seton
World in a Glass - A View of Our Century From the Novels of John Dos Passos, Houghton Mifflin (1966) by John Dos Passos
A Tract of Time (1966) by Smith Hempstone
Jubilee (1966) by Margaret Walker
Earth Abides Houghton Mifflin (1969) by George R. Stewart
Operation Destruct, Holt, Rinehart and Winston (1969) by Christopher Nicole
Logan's Run, Dell paperback (1969) by William F. Nolan and George Clayton Johnson
Where the Cavern Ends, Holt Rinehart & Winston (1970) by Christopher Nicole

References
Notes

American illustrators
1924 births
1995 deaths